Hoke v. United States, 227 U.S. 308 (1913), was a decision by the United States Supreme Court that held that the United States Congress could not regulate prostitution per se, which was strictly the province of the states. Congress could, however, regulate interstate travel for purposes of prostitution or other "immoral purposes." 

The case revolved around an offer to transport women from New Orleans to Beaumont, Texas for the purpose of prostitution. The Supreme Court upheld prosecution under the Mann Act.

See also
List of United States Supreme Court cases, volume 227

Further reading

External links

 

United States Constitution Article One case law
United States Supreme Court cases
United States Supreme Court cases of the White Court
United States Commerce Clause case law
1913 in United States case law
Mann Act
Prostitution law in the United States
Prostitution in Texas
History of Beaumont, Texas
Crime in New Orleans